Cape Nome Mining District Discovery Sites is a National Historic Landmark located in Nome, Alaska. It was named a National Historic Landmark in 1978. It is significant for its role in the history of gold mining in Alaska, in particular the Nome Gold Rush that began in 1899.

It was the discovery of gold at several sites by the "Three Swedes" (Erik Lindblom, __, and ___) that set off the Nome Gold Rush.

Four sites are included within the NHL District:
Anvil Creek Gold Discovery Site, which is separately listed on the National Register
Snow Creek Placer Claim No. 1, which is separately listed on the National Register
Erik Lindblom Placer Claim, which is separately listed on the National Register
Nome Beach, a  area

The three Swedes reported they discovered the Erik Lindblom Placer Claim on Mountain Creek on September 19, 1898, the Snow Creek Claim on September 20, and the Anvil Creek Discovery Claim on September 22.

Gold mining in the Nome mining district continues to this day.

Anvil Creek Gold Discovery Site

It was one of the richest placer claim sites ever found in Alaska and yielded more than $5 million during its first five years. By 1965 the site was "largely returned to nature".

Erik Lindblom Placer Claim

Geologically, a high concentration of gold was produced by ocean waves, similar to the later production of gold concentration on Nome's beach. The site was the first of three gold discovery sites by the three miners.

Oddly, ownership of the claim site could not be determined at the time of its NRHP nomination in 1975;  the last known owner was "Pioneer Mining Company", more than 50 years before then.  In 1975, the area was back to a "natural state", although debris in the form of mining equipment and domestic implements remained.  Nothing on the land then distinguished the Erik Lindblom Placer Claim from the surrounding area.

Snow Creek Placer Claim No. 1

The Snow Creek Placer Claim No. 1 is a -wide strip running  along Snow Creek, up from its confluence with Glacier Creek, which joins the Snake River about  further down.  Snow Creek is often dry.  Placer mining on Snow Creek was nearly exhausted by 1903.

Nome Beach
In 1899, about 1,000 miners in Nome were idle due to the fact that the entire Anvil Creek had been claimed, (and presumably so had all other known placer mining sites in the area).  It was fortuitously discovered that the beach at Nome was itself gold-laden, and rockers could garner $20 to $100 each day.

Locations of all places having coordinates in this page can be seen together in an interactive map, by clicking on "Map of all coordinates using Open Source Map", on the right side of this page.

References

1898 establishments in the United States
Geography of Nome Census Area, Alaska
National Historic Landmarks in Alaska
Historic district contributing properties in Alaska